West Croydon  may refer to:

West Croydon, South Australia, a suburb of Adelaide
West Croydon railway station, Adelaide, South Australia
West Croydon station, Croydon, England

See also
West Croydon to Wimbledon Line, a former railway line in south London, England